The following is a list of Major League Baseball players, retired or active. As of the end of the 2011 season, there have been 945 players with a last name that begins with R who have been on a major league roster at some point.

R

For reasons of space, this list has been split into two pages:
 Brian Raabe through Phil Rizzuto
 Sendy Rleal through Marc Rzepczynski

External links
Last Names starting with R - Baseball-Reference.com

 R